MV Countess II was a ferry owned by the Public Transport Authority and operated under contract by Captain Cook Cruises on Transperth services on the Swan River in Perth, Western Australia.

History
Countess II was built by Dillingham Shipyards in North Fremantle for the Metropolitan Transport Trust. It entered service in October 1969 to replace Mayflower.

References

Ferries of Western Australia
Ships built in Western Australia
1969 ships